The Japanese children's manga series Doraemon was written and illustrated by Fujiko Fujio. It was serialized in various children's manga magazines published by Shogakukan. A total of eight-hundred and fifty chapters were collected in tankōbon by Shogakukan under  imprint. The first volume was published on July 31, 1974 and the last forty-fifth volume on April 26, 1996. The series is about a robotic cat named Doraemon, who travels back in time from the 22nd century to aid a pre-teen boy called .

The series first appeared in December 1969, when it was published simultaneously in six different magazines. A total of 1,344 stories were created in the original series, which are published by Shogakukan under the  manga brand, extending to forty-five volumes. The volumes are collected in the Takaoka Central Library in Toyama, Japan, where Fujiko Fujio was born. In July 2013 it was announced that the manga would be released digitally in English in full-color via the Amazon Kindle e-book service.



English releases
The manga is in full-color available in English on Amazon Kindle in North America. As of October 16, 2016 a total of 200 volumes have been released. On December 27, 2017, the 17 Doraemon Long Stories volumes that were written by Fujiko F. Fujio were also released in full-color on Amazon Kindle.

The same translation of the Doraemon manga used on Amazon Kindle has been published in English in print by Shogakukan Asia. Unlike the Amazon Kindle releases these volumes are in black and white instead of color.
 27 August 2014, ~258-264 pages, 
 27 August 2014, 264 pages, 
 26 November 2014, 248 pages, 
 26 November 2014, ~241-248 pages, 

 Doraemon Box Set (volume 1 to 4), 2014/11, 

The same translation of the Doraemon manga used on Amazon Kindle has also been published in English in print, in six compilation volumes based on the Japanese 1994 Shogakukan Colo Novel releases, also by Shogakukan Asia, as the Doraemon Theme Series. Unlike the Amazon Kindle releases these volumes are in black and white instead of color.
 Romance Collection, 15 January 2020, ~130-132 pages, 
 Zero Points & Runaway Collection, 15 January 2020, ~191-192 pages, 
 Dinosaurs Collection, 14 February 2020, ~162-163 pages, 
 Future & Universe Collection, 14 February 2020, ~137-148 pages, 
 Folktales Collection, 16 March 2020, ~123-124 pages, 
 Emotions Collection, 16 March 2020, ~132-168 pages, 
 Laughter Collection, 17 July 2020, 142 pages, 
 Horror Collection, 17 July 2020, 141 pages, 
 Esprit Collection, 25 September 2020, 152 pages, 
 Fantasy Collection, 25 September 2020, 192 pages,

Bilingual releases

2002-2005
There have been two series of bilingual, Japanese and English, volumes of Doraemon by SHOGAKUKAN ENGLISH COMICS called "Doraemon: Gadget Cat from the Future", and two audio versions.

 2002/02/22, 
 2002/05/31, 
 2002/08/30, 
 2002/11/29, 
 2003/02/28, 
 2003/05/30, 
 2003/12/05, 
 2004/03/26, 
 2004/10/07, 
 2005/02/25, 

 Box Set (volume 1 to 10), March 28, 2006, 

Translations of these volumes were published as 英文版哆啦A夢 by 青文出版社 (CHING WIN PUBLISHING CO., LTD.) in Taiwan, in Chinese by Chuang Yi, in Thailand by NED-Comics, in mainland China by 二十一世紀出版社 (21st Century Publishing House), in Hong Kong by 香港青文出版社 and in Vietnam by Kim Dong Publisher as Đôrêmon học tiếng Anh.

2013-2014
 A Selection of Touching Stories, 2013/10/18,  
 A Selection of Comic Stories, 2013/12/18, 
 A Selection of Love Stories, 2014/02/18, 
 A Selection of Witty Stories, 2014/04/18, 
 A Selection of Scary Stories, 2014/06/18, 
 A Selection of Fantastic Stories, 2014/08/18,

Audio version
 2009/4/22, 
 2009/5/20,

Short stories

References

Doraemon
C